Charles Marion Hockenbery (born December 15, 1950) is a former professional baseball player who played one season, for the California Angels of Major League Baseball.

References

1950 births
Living people
California Angels players
Baseball players from Wisconsin
Sportspeople from La Crosse, Wisconsin
Bend Rainbows players
El Paso Sun Kings players
Idaho Falls Angels players
Jersey City A's players
Quad Cities Angels players
Salt Lake City Angels players
Salt Lake City Gulls players
Shreveport Captains players
Stockton Ports players
Vancouver Canadians players